The 2010 Grand National (officially known as the John Smith's Grand National for sponsorship reasons) was the 163rd renewal of the Grand National horse race that took place at Aintree near Liverpool, England, on 10 April 2010.

The main race was held at 16:15 BST and was won by Don't Push It, ridden by Tony McCoy, five lengths ahead of Black Apalachi in second, and twenty ahead of State of Play in third.

It was McCoy's first win in the Grand National at his fifteenth attempt. Don't Push It started the race as 10–1 joint-favourite, having been backed down from 20–1 in the hours prior to the race. In the process of winning, McCoy avoided equalling the record for most rides in the National without winning, held by Jeff King.

The main race was seen by the largest attendance at Aintree since 2005, with a crowd of 70,341 on the day, and a total of 150,426 attending over the course of the three-day meeting.

Race card 

1: Madison Du Berlais
Weight: 11–10. Jockey: Tom Scudamore; trainer: David Pipe. Colours: purple, yellow triple diamond, yellow sleeves with red armlets and cap.

2: Mon Mome
Weight: 11–7. Jockey: Aidan Coleman; trainer: Venetia Williams. Colours: green, purple armlets

3: Vic Venturi
Weight: 11–6. Jockey: Roger Loughran; trainer: Dessie Hughes (Ireland). Colours: black, yellow diamond on body and cap, diamonds on sleeves.

4: Black Apalachi
Weight: 11–6. Jockey: Denis O'Regan; trainer: Dessie Hughes (Ireland). Colours: green, blue chevrons on sleeves, blue star on cap.

5: Joe Lively
Weight: 11–6. Jockey: Joe Tizzard; trainer: Colin Tizzard. Colours: yellow with red diamond, quartered cap.

6: Don't Push It
Weight: 11–5. Jockey: Tony McCoy; trainer: Jonjo O'Neill. Colours: green and yellow hoops, white cap.

7: Comply or Die
Weight: 11–5. Jockey: Timmy Murphy; trainer: David Pipe. Colours: royal blue, green sleeves, white cap with blue spots.

8: Niche Market
Weight: 11–4. Jockey: Harry Skelton; trainer: Bob Buckler. Colours: orange and blue quarters, hooped sleeves, quartered cap.

9: Tricky Trickster
Weight: 11–4. Jockey: Richard Johnson; trainer: Paul Nicholls. Colours: pink, large purple spots, hooped sleeves. Note: Johnson replaced Barry Geraghty as the jockey of Tricky Trickster following an injury to Ruby Walsh. Geraghty switched to ride joint-favourite Big Fella Thanks.

10: Made in Taipan
Weight: 11–4. Jockey: Niall Madden; trainer: Tom Mullins (Ireland). Colours: orange with black star, diablo sleeves, white and black hooped cap.

11: Dream Alliance
Weight: 11–3. Jockey: Tom O'Brien; trainer: Philip Hobbs. Colours: grey with maroon epaulettes and armbands, hooped cap.

12: Cloudy Lane
Weight: 11–3. Jockey: Jason Maguire; trainer: Donald McCain, Jr. Colours: green and yellow quartered, white sleeves and cap.

13: Nozic
Weight: 11–3. Jockey: Liam Treadwell; trainer: Paul Nicholls. Colours: blue, white disc, stars on sleeves and star on cap.

14: My Will
Weight: 11–2. Jockey: Nick Scholfield; trainer: Paul Nicholls. Colours: black and white halves, red sleeves and cap.

15: Pablo Du Charmil
Weight: 11–2. Jockey: Danny Cook; trainer: David Pipe. Colours: purple, yellow chevron, diablo sleeves.

16: Ballyholland
Weight: 11–0. Jockey: Andrew McNamara; trainer: Colin McBratney (Ireland). Colours: white, yellow stripe, quartered cap.

17: Backstage
Weight: 11–0. Jockey: Davy Condon; trainer: Gordon Elliott (Ireland). Colours: light blue, orange epaulettes, light blue and purple checked cap.

18: Beat the Boys
Weight: 11–0. Jockey: Brian Hughes; trainer: Nigel Twiston-Davies. Colours: pink, blue diamond, diablo sleeves, pink star on blue cap.

19: Priests Leap
Weight: 11–0. Jockey: Philip Enright; trainer: Tom O'Leary (Ireland). Colours: blue, yellow star, stars on sleeves, star on cap.

20: Snowy Morning
Weight: 10–13. Jockey: David Casey; trainer: Willie Mullins (Ireland). Colours: yellow, black braces, yellow and white quartered cap.

21: Can't Buy Time
Weight: 10–13. Jockey: Richie McLernon; trainer: Jonjo O'Neill. Colours: green and yellow hoops, white star on green cap.

22: Big Fella Thanks
Weight: 10–12. Jockey: Barry Geraghty; trainer: Paul Nicholls. Colours: purple with grey hooped sleeves. Note: Twice-winning jockey Ruby Walsh was originally scheduled to ride Big Fella Thanks but was ruled out when he was injured in a heavy fall on Celestial Halo in the 2:50 pm race earlier in the day.

23: State of Play
Weight: 10–11. Jockey: Paul Moloney; trainer: Evan Williams. Colours: blue with pink hoop.

24: Character Building
Weight: 10–11. Jockey: Nina Carberry; trainer: John Quinn. Colours: pink with purple crossbelts, hooped sleeves and cap.

25: Ellerslie George
Weight: 10–10. Jockey: Christian Williams; trainer: Nick Mitchell. Colours: blue with green hoop and cap, red sleeves.

26: Eric's Charm
Weight: 10–9. Jockey: Wayne Hutchinson; trainer: Oliver Sherwood. Colours: yellow and pink diamonds, yellow sleeves and cap.

27: King Johns Castle
Weight: 10–9. Jockey: Paul Carberry; trainer: Arthur Moore (Ireland). Colours: green and yellow hoops, red cap.

28: Conna Castle
Weight: 10–9. Jockey: Sean Flanagan; trainer: Jimmy Mangan (Ireland). Colours: orange and light blue diamonds, orange sleeves and cap with blue stars.

29: Ballyfitz
Weight: 10–9. Jockey: David England; trainer: Nigel Twiston-Davies. Colours: light blue and maroon diablo and quartered cap, light blue sleeves.

30: Ollie Magern
Weight: 10–9. Jockey: Tom Molloy; trainer: Nigel Twiston-Davies. Colours: light blue, maroon stars and sleeves.

31: Arbor Supreme
Weight: 10–8. Jockey: Paul Townend; trainer: Willie Mullins (Ireland). Colours: green and yellow hoops, blue cap.

32: Maljimar
Weight: 10–8. Jockey: Daryl Jacob; trainer: Nick Williams. Colours: orange with black star on body and cap.

33: The Package
Weight: 10–7. Jockey: Graham Lee; trainer: David Pipe. Colours: royal blue, emerald green sleeves, red cap.

34: Piraya
Weight: 10–7. Jockey: Johnny Farrelly; trainer: David Pipe. Colours: white, large red spots, armlets and quartered cap.

35: Irish Raptor
Weight: 10–7. Jockey: Paddy Brennan; trainer: Nigel Twiston-Davies. Colours: green, yellow stars, striped sleeves, blue and yellow cap.

36: Cerium
Weight: 10–5. Jockey: Davy Russell; trainer: Paul Murphy. Colours: green, white star, black striped sleeves, white cap with black star.

37: Palypso De Creek
Weight: 10–6. Jockey: Tom Siddall; trainer: Charlie Longsdon. Colours: blue, dark green sleeves and cap.

38: Hello Bud
Weight: 10–6. Jockey: Sam Twiston-Davies; trainer: Nigel Twiston-Davies. Colours: white, blue spotted body and sleeves, striped cap.

39: Flintoff
Weight: 10–5. Jockey: Andrew Tinkler; trainer: Venetia Williams. Colours: blue, pink hooped sleeves and cap.

40: Royal Rosa
Weight: 10–5. Jockey: Wilson Renwick; trainer: Howard Johnson. Colours: black and beige halved, beige sleeves with black chevrons, beige cap

Originally, Royal Rosa was a reserve, but ran because of the withdrawal of Abbeybraney. Silver Birch was originally due to be the first reserve, when it was clear there were to be no withdrawals, Gordon Elliott took out Silver Birch so Mr Wylie could run Royal Rosa instead of Abbeybraney, and Silver Birch ran in the Topham Chase instead.

Finishing order

Non-finishers

Trivia
For the first time since 2005, there were no equine fatalities in the main race. In each of the previous four years there was one casualty.

Plaisir d'Estruval and Prudent Honour both died instantly after jumping Valentine's, the 13th fence in the Topham Chase on 9 April, a handicap over two miles and  furlongs. Both horses broke their necks. Earlier the same day, in the grade one Melling Chase over standard chase fences on the Mildmay track, Schindlers Hunt was put down after fracturing a leg in a fall at the third fence. Schindlers Hunt's jockey Paddy Flood broke his collarbone in the fall; the other jockeys were unhurt.

Coral bookmakers took the decision to refund bets placed on race-day for King John's Castle. The horse was bidding to become the first grey to win the National since 1961, but refused to run when the race started. Although under betting rules customers bets should have been classified as losers, Coral took the decision to make a goodwill refund gesture to their customers.

Jockeys and quotes
Selected quotes from the jockeys including winner at the fifteenth attempt, Tony McCoy, 17-year-old Sam Twiston-Davies who was aiming to become the second-youngest winning jockey ever, and Nina Carberry attempting to be first female rider to win the race:

Tony McCoy (Don't Push It, first): "If you get enough goes at something and you keep going, once you're in there you've always got a chance. I'm delighted for JP [McManus, owner] as he's the best supporter this game has ever had and ever will have, and I'm very privileged to ride a Grand National winner in his colours."
Denis O'Regan (Black Apalachi, second): "My fella's a tremendous horse and he gave me a tremendous feel. He just loves bowling along and loves this place. He was a bit keen early on but once he settled into a lovely rhythm he was fantastic. It's a pleasure to ride a horse like him round here."
Paul Moloney (State of Play, third): "It was a serious run from a serious horse who's been very good to me – and he might win it next year, please God."
Barry Geraghty (late replacement jockey for Big Fella Thanks, fourth): "That was brilliant. He galloped from end to end, the best ride I've ever had round here. But if you can't have the winner then it's good to see AP [McCoy] win it."
Sam Twiston-Davies (Hello Bud, fifth): "That was brilliant. The horse has been a real star and has jumped from fence to fence."
Nina Carberry (Character Building, seventh): "He couldn't lay up and the plan was to give him a chance. I thought I had a really great chance of being in the money and in the first three over the Canal Turn, but he got tapped for toe and in the end I just got done for sixth. He ran a great race had it been softer he might have come back to them a bit more. Hopefully he'll come back next year."

Tony McCoy lined up as the most experienced rider in the race for the fourth consecutive year, having taken over as senior rider from Carl Llewellyn after the 2006 National. It had also been an honour he had shared for a time with Mick Fitzgerald and Paul Carberry. 2010 also marked McCoy's fifteenth ride in the National, a feat previously achieved by only nine other riders, however, defeat this year would have seen McCoy become only the second rider to take fifteen rides in the race without ever winning. His ultimate victory saw this dubious honour remain solely Jeff King's.

At the opposite extreme, nine riders made their Grand National debut, though only one, Sam Twiston-Davies managed to complete the course, finishing fifth. Danny Cook's first National ended at the second fence while Ritchie McLernon, Brian Hughes, Roger Loughran, Tom Siddall, Harry Skelton and Tom Molloy were also taking part for the first time.

Broadcasting
As the Grand National was accorded the status as an event of national interest within the United Kingdom and was listed on the Ofcom Code on Sports and Other Listed and Designated Events, the event had to be shown on free-to-air terrestrial television in the UK. As with previous years the rights to broadcast the race were held by the BBC and the race, along with several others were shown on BBC One. It was also the first horse race in the UK to be broadcast in high definition on the BBC HD channel. The BBC's coverage was produced by Sunset + Vine who, with the aid of the SiS outside broadcast unit, provided coverage of fifteen races throughout the three-day meeting.

Clare Balding served as anchor presenter for the fifth consecutive year with Rishi Persad providing interviews from the jockey's room as well as taking a closer look at the horses in the paddock with Richard Dunwoody. Mick Fitzgerald guided viewers through the course as well as providing post-race analysis from all the build-up races. Richard Pitman provided nostalgia with interviews with several famous names from the history of the race, including an interview with his ex-wife Jenny Pitman while Lizzie Greenwood-Hughes interviewed spectators in the stands for unusual and interesting stories. John Parrott and Gary Wiltshire completed the team with news from the betting ring.

The commentary team for the 2010 Grand National consisted of Ian Bartlett, Darren Owen and Jim McGrath, who called the winner home for the thirteenth consecutive year. This was the first time for six years that the team had been reduced from four to three with Tony O'Hehir being dropped in what the BBC called a cost-cutting exercise. As is tradition, anchor presenter Balding conducted the interviews with the winning connections while Bartlett, Dunwoody and Fitzgerald then took the viewers through a detailed rerun of the race.

BBC radio also covered the race live for the seventy-ninth time as part of its wider Five Live Sports broadcast. Mark Pougatch presented the programme live from Aintree with race commentary called by Cornelius Lysaght and John Hunt. The race was also covered by Racing UK into bookmakers' offices throughout the UK and Ireland using alternative camera shots from the BBC with their own commentary team.

References

External links
 Grand National runners and riders, BBC Sport, 10 April 2010
 Grand National 2010 – as it happened The Guardian

2010
2010 in horse racing
2010 in English sport
April 2010 sports events in the United Kingdom
2010 Grand National
Grand